Saikheda Dam, is an earthfill dam on Khuni river near Pandharkawada, Yavatmal district in state of Maharashtra in India.Saikheda Dam was constructed as part of irrigation projects by Government of Maharashtra in the year 1972 . Nearest city to dam is Pandharkawada and the Dam is situated in Kelapur Taluka of Yavatmal District of Maharashtra . It is built on and impounds Khuni River, .

Specifications

Purpose
 Irrigation

See also
 Dams in Maharashtra
 List of reservoirs and dams in India

References

Dams in Yavatmal district
Dams completed in 1972
1972 establishments in Maharashtra